Lieutenant Colonel Ronald Charles Speirs (20 April 1920 – 11 April 2007) was a United States Army officer who served in the 506th Parachute Infantry Regiment of the 101st Airborne Division during World War II. He was initially assigned as a platoon leader in B Company of the 1st Battalion of the 506th Parachute Infantry Regiment. Speirs was reassigned to D Company of the 2nd Battalion prior to the invasion of Normandy in June 1944 and later assigned as commander of E Company during an assault on Foy, Belgium after the siege of Bastogne was broken during the Battle of the Bulge. He finished the war in the European Theater as a captain. Speirs served in the Korean War, as a major commanding a rifle company and as a staff officer. He later became the American governor for Spandau Prison in Berlin. He retired as a Lieutenant colonel.

In the award-winning television miniseries Band of Brothers, he was portrayed by Matthew Settle.

Early life
Speirs was born in Edinburgh, Scotland in 1920 and spent his first few years there. He emigrated with his family to the United States, arriving in Boston, Massachusetts on 25 December 1924. He attended military training in high school, which led to a commission as a 2nd lieutenant in the infantry of the United States Army.

Military service
Speirs volunteered for the paratroopers after the United States entered World War II. There he served as a platoon leader within Dog Company, 2nd Battalion of the 506th Parachute Infantry Regiment, which later became part of the 101st Airborne Division, at Camp Toccoa, Georgia and was then shipped to England in late 1943. After arriving in England, the division began training for the invasion of France.

World War II

Speirs parachuted into Normandy on 6 June 1944 (or D-Day) and quickly met with fellow troops after landing. He assembled a small group of soldiers to assist during the Brecourt Manor Assault, where they captured the fourth 105mm howitzer.

Speirs' platoon spent the night of 6 June being shuffled in position with other platoons as the company was arranged for battle to begin early the next morning. A rolling artillery barrage had been coordinated in support of the ground assault on the morning of 7 June, to initiate the attack. It was here that PFC Art DiMarzio, who is also referenced in the book "Beyond Band of Brothers", was eyewitness to an event. He stated that a replacement sergeant disobeyed a direct order while in a combat situation, thereby risking the lives of the other soldiers in the company. According to DiMarzio, Speirs, commanding 2nd platoon, Dog Company was given orders to halt their attack on Ste. Come-du-Mont, to hold position while regimental headquarters coordinated a rolling barrage shelling fifteen targets in the vicinity of St. Marie-du-Mont. DiMarzio, who was lying in a prone position next to a sergeant, stated he remembered the sergeant being drunk. An order to hold position was given and relayed down the line which the sergeant refused to obey, wanting to rush forward and engage the Germans. Once again, Speirs gave him the order to hold his position. Speirs told the man that he was too drunk to perform his duties and that he should remove himself to the rear. The sergeant refused and began to reach for his rifle. Speirs again warned the sergeant, who now levelled his rifle at Speirs. Art DiMarzio says he then saw Speirs shoot the sergeant in self-defense. The entire platoon also witnessed the event. Lieutenant Speirs immediately reported the incident to his commanding officer, Captain Jerre S Gross. Eyewitness DiMarzio says that Captain Gross went to the scene of the shooting and after receiving all the information, deemed it justifiable self-defense. Captain Gross was killed in battle the next day, and the incident was never pursued.

In January 1945, when Easy Company's initial attack on the German-occupied town of Foy bogged down due to the commander 1st Lieutenant Norman Dike, battalion executive officer Captain Richard Winters ordered Speirs to relieve Dike of command. The selection of Speirs was incidental; Winters later stated that Speirs was simply the first officer he saw when he turned around. Speirs successfully took over the assault and led Easy Company to victory. During this battle, Lt. Dike had ordered a platoon to go on a flanking mission around the rear of the town. To countermand this order, Speirs himself ran through the town and German lines (as this platoon had no radio), linked up with the Item Company soldiers and relayed the order. Having completed this, he then ran back through the German-occupied town. He was reassigned as commanding officer of Easy Company and remained in that position for the rest of the war. Of the officers who commanded Easy Company during the war, Speirs commanded the longest.

Winters assessed Speirs as being one of the finest combat officers in the battalion. He wrote in his memoirs that Speirs had worked hard to earn a reputation as a killer and had often killed for shock value. Winters stated that Speirs was alleged on one occasion to have killed six German prisoners of war with a Thompson submachine gun and that the battalion leadership must have been aware of the allegations, but chose to ignore the charges because of the pressing need to retain qualified combat leaders. Winters concluded that in today's army, Speirs would have been court-martialed and charged with atrocities, but at the time officers like Speirs were too valuable because they were not afraid to engage the enemy. Decades after the war, in an interview with then-Congressman John D. Payne, Winters stated that the legal department for publisher Simon & Schuster was concerned that the allegations surrounding Speirs could lead to a lawsuit, leading Winters to directly confront him about the rumor. Winters went on to say that Speirs not only confirmed the allegation, but wrote a letter to that effect.

Although Speirs had enough points to go home after the end of the European Campaign, he chose to remain with Easy Company. Japan surrendered before Speirs and Easy could be transferred to the Pacific Theater.

Korean War
Speirs returned to the United States and decided to remain in the Army, serving in the Korean War. On 23 March 1951, he participated in Operation Tomahawk in which he made a combat parachute jump into Munsan-ni with nearly 3,500 other troopers in his unit (187th Regimental Combat Team). As a rifle company commander, he was part of his battalion's mission to secure the drop zone; forty to fifty enemies were killed and wounded by the battalion.

Cold War
Following Korea, Speirs attended a Russian language course in 1956 and was assigned as a liaison officer to the Red Army in Potsdam, East Germany. In 1958, he became the American governor of the Spandau Prison in Berlin, where prominent Nazis such as Rudolf Hess were imprisoned. Prisoner Albert Speer mentions in his book, Spandau: The Secret Diaries, a "hard-nosed, irritating American Commandant"; that man was later identified as Speirs.

In 1962, Speirs was a member of the US Mission to the Royal Lao Army, where he served as a training officer in Mobile Training Team (MTT) for Operation White Star which was then managed by the Military Assistance Advisory Group in Laos (MAAG Laos).

His final assignment in the Army was as a plans officer in The Pentagon. He retired as a lieutenant colonel in 1964.

Personal life
On 20 May 1944, Speirs married Margaret Griffiths, whom he had met while stationed in Wiltshire, England. Griffiths had been a member of the Auxiliary Territorial Service. They had one son, Robert, who grew up to become a lieutenant colonel in the Royal Green Jackets.

The 1992 Stephen E. Ambrose book Band of Brothers claimed Speirs' English wife had left him and returned to her first husband whom she believed died during the war. Speirs denied this claim. In a 1992 letter written to Richard Winters, Speirs wrote that his first wife simply did not want to move to America with him and be away from her family in England. He also stated his wife was never a widow to begin with and that he had always loved her.

Awards and decorations

{|
|
|Silver Star
|-
|
|Legion of Merit
|-
|
|Bronze Star with two Oak Leaf Clusters
|-
|
|Purple Heart with one Oak Leaf Clusters
|-
|
|Army Commendation Medal
|-
|
|Presidential Unit Citation with one Oak Leaf Cluster
|-
|
|American Campaign Medal
|-
|
|European-African-Middle Eastern Campaign Medal with four Service Stars and Arrowhead Device
|-
|
|World War II Victory Medal
|-
|
|Army of Occupation Medal
|-
|
|National Defense Service Medal with Service star
|-
|
|Korean Service Medal with four Service Stars and Arrowhead Device
|-
|
|Croix de Guerre with palm
|-
|
|French Liberation Medal
|-
|
|Republic of Korea Presidential Unit Citation
|-
|
|United Nations Korea Medal
|-
|
|Korean War Service Medal

See also

References

External links
 RonaldSpeirs.com
 Biography on Heroes Forever

1920 births
2007 deaths
United States Army personnel of World War II
United States Army personnel of the Korean War
Band of Brothers characters
Military personnel from Edinburgh
Recipients of the Silver Star
United States Army officers
Scottish emigrants to the United States